William C. Doran (1884–1965) was an associate justice of the California Court of Appeal, Second Appellate District, Division 1, from October 14, 1935, until 1958. He was born December 21, 1884, in Cincinnati, Ohio, and died January 23, 1965, in Los Angeles, California.

Doran received his law degree from the University of Southern California Law School in 1907 and was admitted to the bar in July of that year. He was a deputy district attorney in Los Angeles County from 1910 to 1917 and chief deputy from 1917 to 1923, when he was made a judge of the Los Angeles Superior Court, a position he held from January 2, 1923 to October 13, 1935.

See also
Ku Klux Klan in Inglewood, California

References

1884 births
1965 deaths
Judges of the California Courts of Appeal
USC Gould School of Law alumni
20th-century American judges